Onota Lake is located in Pittsfield, Massachusetts. It is divided into north and south basins due to the old roadway that marked to north end with minimal water exchange between them and empties via Onota Brook which flows southeast into the West Branch of the Housatonic River in Pittsfield. The "cottagers" of the late 19th century and early 20th century built large summer mansions along its shores.

Onota Lake is popular for fishing, swimming, water skiing, jet skiing, and sailing. It is home to the famous Pittsfield event "Live on the Lake", a summer concert series consisting of local bands. Camp Winadu is located along its shores. The Williams Ephs men's and women's crews row on the lake.

References

External links
 Lake Onota Preservation Association

Reservoirs in Massachusetts
Lakes of Berkshire County, Massachusetts